Teesta Low Dam - III Hydropower Plant is a run-of-the-river hydroelectric station built on the Teesta River. The Dam is located at Rambi Bazar, Kalimpong district, West Bengal.

Geography

Location
It is located in Reang, Kalimpong district of West Bengal, a little above Rambi Bazar (see map alongside).

The project
The project consists of a 32 m high dam with 4 penstocks of 44 m length and 7 m diameter each. The surface power house with installed capacity of 132 MW houses 4 units of 33 MW capacity each designed to operate under the net rated head of 21.34 M and designed to generate 594.07 million units in a 90% dependable year with 95% machine availability.  Unit I & II were commissioned in the month of January 2013 and Unit III & IV in the month of February and March 2013 respectively. The state of West Bengal is the sole beneficiary of this power station. With the construction of the project the area is also benefited by development infrastructure, education, medical facilities and employment avenues.

References 

Hydroelectric power stations in West Bengal
Run-of-the-river power stations
Dams in West Bengal
Energy infrastructure completed in 2013
2013 establishments in West Bengal